Denis Caulfield Brady  (1804 – 30 November 1886) was a Whig Member of the Parliament of the United Kingdom who represented the constituency of Newry. He was a native of Newry, the son of Thomas Brady and Rose Caulfield, and educated at Trinity College Dublin. He was a reformer, in favour of the emancipation of Catholics and the abolition of tithes, and he was elected through the support of the poor Catholics of Newry. As a result of Brady's victory over Sir Thomas Staples in 1835, the Earl of Kilmorey evicted more than 80 families from his lands for their votes. Brady became Chairman of the Newry Navigation Company and was also a Magistrate and Lord Lieutenant for County Down. He remained a devoted member of the Liberal Party, into which the Whigs merged in 1859, but toward the end of his life he increasingly supported the Unionist cause. He died in Newry, aged 82.

References

External links 

 

Date of birth missing
1804 births
1886 deaths
Members of the Parliament of the United Kingdom for Newry (1801–1918)
UK MPs 1835–1837
Whig (British political party) MPs for Irish constituencies
Irish Roman Catholics
Alumni of Trinity College Dublin